It's Time is the third studio album by the Canadian rock band the Guess Who. It's also the last to feature original lead singer Chad Allan who left after the release of the album. This album introduces Burton Cummings and Bruce Decker of The Deverons. Bruce Decker is shown on the album cover, but did not perform on the album. This album was a big turning point for the group. The album draws towards their garage rock style.

Track listing
All songs written and composed by Randy Bachman except where noted.

Personnel
Chad Allan - lead vocals, rhythm guitar
Burton Cummings - keyboards, backing vocals and lead on tracks (1, 6, 7, & 9)
Randy Bachman - lead guitar, backing vocals
Jim Kale - bass, backing vocals
Garry Peterson - drums

Charts
Singles

References

1966 albums
The Guess Who albums
Quality Records albums